Senator Ames may refer to:

Adelbert Ames (1835–1933), U.S. Senator from Mississippi from 1870 to 1874
Alfred Elisha Ames (1814–1874), Illinois State Senate
Alfred K. Ames (1866–1950), Maine State Senate
Benjamin Ames (1778–1835), Maine State Senate
Cheney Ames (1808–1892), New York State Senate
DeHart H. Ames (1872–1955), New York State Senate
E. Almer Ames Jr. (1903–1987), Virginia State Senate
Frederick Lothrop Ames (1835–1893), Massachusetts State Senate
Oliver Ames (governor) (1831–1895), Massachusetts State Senate
Oliver Ames Jr. (1807–1877), Utah State Senate
Oliver Ames Sr. (1779–1863), Massachusetts State Senate
Samuel Ames (1824–1875), New York State Senate